Khalilan (also Romanized as Khalīlān; also known as Kalīrān and Khalīrān) is a village in Barakuh Rural District, Jolgeh-e Mazhan District, Khusf County, South Khorasan Province, Iran. At the 2006 census, its population was 96, in 35 families.

References 

Populated places in Khusf County